Arthur Roe (July 18, 1878 – April 17, 1942) was an American politician and lawyer.

Biography
Born in Shafter, Illinois, Roe moved with his parents to Vandalia, Illinois. Roe received his law degree from University of Illinois Law School. He was the city attorney of Vandalia, Illinois and master of chancery of Fayette County, Illinois from 1911 to 1913. Roe  was a Democrat. From 1913 until 1935, Roe served in the Illinois House of Representatives and was speaker of the house in 1933. In 1935, Roe was appointed United States Attorney for the United States District Court for the Eastern District of Illinois. Roe was still in that office when he died of a heart ailment in East Saint Louis, Illinois.

References

1878 births
1942 deaths
People from Fayette County, Illinois
University of Illinois College of Law alumni
Illinois state court judges
Speakers of the Illinois House of Representatives
Democratic Party members of the Illinois House of Representatives
People from Vandalia, Illinois